The 2021–22 season is Derby County's 138th season in existence, their 14th consecutive season in the Championship, and their 54th season overall in the second division of English football. Alongside the Championship, they also competed in the FA Cup and the EFL Cup. Derby were relegated after finishing in 23rd place in the league following a points deduction. The season covers the period from July 2021 to 30 June 2022.

Administration
On 22 September 2021, the EFL released a statement stating Derby were given a 12-point deduction in accordance with regulations after entering administration. On 16 November, Derby were deducted a further nine points after admitting to breaching EFL accounting rules.

Pre-season friendlies
The Rams revealed they would have friendlies against Manchester United, Salford City, Real Betis and Notts County as part of their pre-season preparations.

Competitions

Championship

League table

Results summary

Results by matchday

Matches
Derby County's fixtures were revealed on 24 June 2021.

FA Cup

Derby were drawn away to Coventry City in the third round.

EFL Cup

Derby County were drawn at home to Salford City in the first round and away to Sheffield United in the second round.

Transfers

Transfers in

Loans in

Loans out

Transfers out

Players

Current squad

Statistics

Appearances and goals

|-
! colspan=14 style=background:#dcdcdc; text-align:center| Goalkeepers

|-
! colspan=14 style=background:#dcdcdc; text-align:center| Defenders

|-
! colspan=14 style=background:#dcdcdc; text-align:center| Midfielders

|-
! colspan=14 style=background:#dcdcdc; text-align:center| Forwards

|-
! colspan=14 style=background:#dcdcdc; text-align:center| Players transferred out during the season

|-

Notes

References

Derby County
Derby County F.C. seasons